Pozo (Spanish for "Well") is an unincorporated community along the former Butterfield Overland Mail stagecoach route, in San Luis Obispo County, California. The closest communities appearing on road maps are California Valley and Santa Margarita. A USGS-provided set of coordinates for the town are on the Santa Margarita Lake 7.5-minute quadrangle.

Pozo was named by George Washington Lingo, Esq., "a well known citizen" who proposed the name for the post office because the village is in a holelike valley—pozo means "well" or "hole" in Spanish.

Pozo is home to the still thriving Pozo Saloon, established in 1858. During its early years, the Pozo Saloon was the primary watering hole for weary travelers making their way over Pozo Summit. Today it has taken its place among the best recognized concert venues on the Central Coast. From Willie Nelson to the Black Crowes, the Pozo Saloon has transformed itself from a dusty Civil War era saloon to a must-go-to concert destination.

The ZIP Code is 93453. The community is inside area code 805.

Notes

External links

Pozo Saloon web site

Unincorporated communities in San Luis Obispo County, California
Unincorporated communities in California